Sarah LaTourette (born May 25, 1983) is an American politician who served as a member of the Ohio House of Representatives from the 76th district and is now serving as the executive director of Ohio Family and Children First, a partnership of government agencies and community organizations that works to coordinate services for children in need.

Career 
The daughter of former Congressman Steve LaTourette, she worked in both the private and public sectors before seeking public office. She initially sought to challenge incumbent Republican Matt Lynch in a primary election, but he opted out of a re-election bid to run for the United States Congress. LaTourette was uncontested in the primary, and won the general election with 68% of the vote. Her district included most of Geauga County and the northern part of Portage County. She resigned on May 5, 2019 to accept the job as executive director of the nonprofit Ohio Family and Children First.

Bills against abortion
LaTourette is an ardent opponent of abortion, and worked for two years as a lobbyist for anti-abortion organizations. LaTourette introduced Bill 214 to the Ohio House of Representatives in 2017, prohibiting "anyone from performing or inducing an abortion if that person has knowledge that the diagnosis or test result indicating Down syndrome in an unborn child is the reason for seeking the abortion [and] Violation of the statute would be a fourth-degree felony and would result in the State [of Ohio] Medical Board revoking a physician’s license."

References

External links
 Official campaign site

1983 births
Living people
Miami University alumni
Republican Party members of the Ohio House of Representatives
Women state legislators in Ohio
21st-century American politicians
21st-century American women politicians
People from Geauga County, Ohio